The 1909–10 season was Chelsea Football Club's fifth competitive season and fifth year in existence. They club finished 19th in the First Division and were relegated.

Table

References

External links
 Chelsea 1909–10 season at stamford-bridge.com

1909–10
English football clubs 1909–10 season